Paccheri is a type of pasta in the shape of a very large tube, originating from Campania. They are generally smooth, but there is also a ribbed version, paccheri millerighe. The name comes from Neapolitan paccharia, "slaps" with a depreciative -ero to indicate something common. The name has been ascribed to a slapping sound they may make when eaten.

They can be served stuffed or not.

Notes

Types of pasta
Cuisine of Campania
Neapolitan cuisine
Stuffed dishes